Oligolepis acutipennis, the sharptail goby, is a species of goby native to marine, freshwater and brackish waters along the coasts of Indo-West Pacific region.  This species can reach a length of  TL.

Mostly inhabit in muddy estuaries and coastal bays  around marine and brackish water, enters freshwater systems.

Distribution
The true distribution is unknown. But, may found in Indo-West Pacific regional countries such as India, Indonesia, Japan, Kenya, Madagascar, Palau, Solomon Islands, South Africa and perhaps in Sri Lanka.

Sources

 https://www.researchgate.net/publication/230139422_Maturation_and_spawning_of_a_gobiid_fish_Oligolepis_acutipennis_(Cuv.__Val.)_from_the_southwest_coast_of_India
 http://www.practicalfishkeeping.co.uk/content.php?sid=3143

acutipennis
Freshwater fish of Sri Lanka
Taxa named by Achille Valenciennes
Fish described in 1837